Live Alive is the first live album compiled from four live performances by Stevie Ray Vaughan and Double Trouble.  The performances were recorded on July 15, 1985 at the Montreux Jazz Festival; July 17–18, 1986 at the Austin Opera House; and July 19, 1986 at Dallas Starfest. Much of the album was overdubbed in the studio.

Track listing

Charts and certifications

Personnel 
 Stevie Ray Vaughan – guitar and vocals
 Tommy Shannon – bass
 Chris "Whipper" Layton – drums
 Reese Wynans – keyboards

References

Stevie Ray Vaughan live albums
1986 live albums
Epic Records live albums
Albums recorded at the Montreux Jazz Festival
Live blues albums